de Vigne (in some cases De Vigne) is a surname. De la Vigne is a closely related name. Notable people with the names include:

De Vigne
Félix De Vigne (1806–1862), Belgian painter
Julius De Vigne (1844–1906), Belgian lawyer, politician and writer
Paul de Vigne (1843–1901), Belgian sculptor

De la Vigne
Anne de La Vigne (1634–1684), French poet and philosopher
Jean Cavenac de la Vigne, 16th century French diplomat
Michel de La Vigne (1588–1648), French physician
Rudolf de la Vigne (1920–2004), German footballer

See also the surname Vigne.